Gim So-hui (born August 19, 1996 in Gangwon, South Korea) is an alpine skier from South Korea.

Career
She competed for South Korea at the 2014 Winter Olympics and at the 2018 Winter Olympics in the alpine skiing events.

Biography
At 1st grade in elementary school,her talent was noticed by her grandma on her mother's side who was a pastor and ski instructor in Pyeongchang. She went to Sangji Daegwallyeong High School. She went to Cheonan campus of Dankook University.

Personal life
She is a Christian.

References

1996 births
Living people
Olympic alpine skiers of South Korea
Alpine skiers at the 2014 Winter Olympics
Alpine skiers at the 2018 Winter Olympics
Alpine skiers at the 2022 Winter Olympics
South Korean female alpine skiers
Alpine skiers at the 2017 Asian Winter Games
Sportspeople from Gangwon Province, South Korea
21st-century South Korean women